Jürgen Saler (born 4 October 1977) is a retired Austrian footballer.

References

1977 births
Living people
Association football midfielders
Austrian footballers
Austrian Football Bundesliga players
SK Rapid Wien players
Kapfenberger SV players
People from Knittelfeld
Footballers from Styria